Years Around the Sun is an indie/electro band currently signed to Manaloft Records. The group was formed in 2004 by Ronnie Dudek and Dylan Raasch who are based out of San Diego, California and Portland, Oregon respectively.

History 

Formed as a side project in 2004, Dylan Raasch and Ronnie Dudek enlisted long time friends, Chris Cote to play drums and classical pianist, Mia Stefanko to play keys and piano and began work on their first EP, Introstay. With songs featured in several surf films, the group caught the attention of popular film director Taylor Steele (filmmaker) who asked the band to write a song for his upcoming film, "Sipping Jetstreams".   The band recorded Heart Delay for the film and soon gained international recognition. With the release of Inva De Siva in 2008, the group did small tours in California. In 2010, the group recorded three more songs for Steele's follow up film, "Castles in the Sky". The band released their second full-length album, Incarnation, on January 1, 2012.

Discography 

EPs
 Introstay (2005)

Albums
 Inva De Siva (2008)
 Incarnation (2012)

Soundtracks 
 Castles in the Sky (2010)

Remixes
 Ginormous / Protist Remix (2009)

Singles
 Heart Delay - Sipping Jetstreams (2008)
 Miles Away (Acoustic Edit) (2010)

Music videos

 Heart Delay (2007)
 Failing at Art (2008)
 Miles Away (2010)

References

External links 
 Official Site <
 Facebook 
 Myspace 

American indie rock groups